Thrinascotrematidae is a family of trematodes belonging to the order Plagiorchiida.

Genera:
 Thrinascotrema

References

Plagiorchiida